Eden Primary School is a cross-communal Jewish Primary school or Jewish day school in Muswell Hill, in the borough of Haringey, North London, UK, catering for children aged 4 to 11. 

It is distinctive for actively welcoming children irrespective of their religious background. It opened in September 2011.
Eden Primary is the first Primary Free School to be commissioned by the UK Government under the Free school (England) programme. Of those initial Free Schools whose costs were released by the UK Government, it received the largest amount of investment, at £6.2 million

The school's original working name was 'Haringey Jewish Primary School', but the permanent name of Eden was adopted in order to convey the school's ethos more clearly.
Eden is a small, single-form-entry school, admitting 30 children into Reception each year. It began with a single Reception class and is building up its population gradually, with a new class of 4-5-year-olds joining each September. Its first year was spent in temporary accommodation, and it moved to permanent premises in September 2012. The cost of construction was budgeted and delivered at £2.6 million.
323 applications to open Free Schools were received by the Department for Education in the first year of operation, out of which 24 schools opened in 2011.
Admissions Policy: like all faith-based Free Schools Eden admits 50% of places on the basis of proximity, not faith. The other 50% of places are offered on the basis of Jewish practice. As with other state-maintained schools, the admissions process is run by the Local Education Authority. In 2010 one family attempted to enrol their daughter before she had been born.
Eden Primary's building received planning permission on 13 September 2011. It was erected between September 2011 and September 2012 by Rydon Construction. It is a cedar-clad construction, designed to emphasize the school's interest in nature.

The school provides both a general and a Jewish education, and also teaches Modern Hebrew as a spoken language. Jewish Studies and Hebrew make up approximately 17% of the total curriculum time.

The school's Head teacher is Jo Sassienie. The Chair of Governors is Peter Kessler.

References

External links 
Eden Primary official website

Primary schools in the London Borough of Haringey
Jewish schools in England
Free schools in London
Educational institutions established in 2011
2011 establishments in England
Muswell Hill